The Raxaul–Kathmandu railway line is a proposed cross-border railway between India and Nepal. The governments of India and Nepal had issued a joint statement on expanding rail linkages with India's financial support, connecting the border city of Raxaul in India to Kathmandu in Nepal. Nepal signed a memorandum of understanding with India to prepare a detailed project report for a proposed railway linking the two towns, with an estimated cost around US$3 billion.

Konkan Railway Corporation conducted a preliminary engineering pre-feasibility study (cum traffic survey) of the proposed broad gauge (1,676 mm) railway project. According to the pre-feasibility study the railway line will start from Raxaul and pass through Jitpur, Nijgadh, Sikharpur, Sisneri and Sathikhel before connecting Chobhar and Kathmandu. Around 20 per cent of it will consist of tunnels and bridges. About 40 km section will have tunnels and 35 bridges have to be built in different places. The Detail Project Report (DPR) for the Raxaul–Kathmandu railroad is ongoing.

Key features of the railway line
Electrified railway line
Total length 135 km
120 km/h speed
Broud gauge 1676 mm
41 major bridges
39 tunnels
13 stations
Estimate cost INR 16550.446 (US$2.64 billion)

See also 
 Cross-border railway lines in India
 Railway stations in Nepal
 Nepal Railways
 Indian Railways
 Railway stations in India

References 

International railway lines in Asia
5 ft 6 in gauge railways in India
Rail transport in Nepal
Transport in Kathmandu